There are a number of alternative names for Northern Ireland. Northern Ireland consists of six historic counties of Ireland, and remains part of the United Kingdom following the independence of the other twenty-six counties as the Irish Free State in 1922 (now the Republic of Ireland, officially named "Ireland"). In addition to, and sometimes instead of, its official name, several other names are used for the region. Significant differences in political views between unionists and Irish nationalists are reflected in the variations of names they use for the region. A proposal to change Northern Ireland's legal name to Ulster was seriously considered by the UK and Northern Ireland Governments in 1949 but in the end, the name "Northern Ireland" was retained.

Names

Legal name
The official and legal name of the region is Northern Ireland. The legal name is used by both the British and Irish governments, internationally by governments around the world, and by most of its inhabitants.

Political names

Unionist-associated names
Ulster is often used by unionists and some media outlets in the UK. This is the Hiberno-Norse form of the province of Uladh (pronounced "Ull-ah") (Irish Uladh and Old Norse ster, meaning "province", yields "Uladh Ster" or, in English, "Ulster"). Examples of official use of this term are the Ulster Unionist Party, the University of Ulster, and the BBC Radio Ulster.

This term is disliked by some nationalists because the whole of the Province of Ulster consists of nine counties – three of which, County Monaghan, County Cavan and County Donegal, are in the Republic of Ireland. Unionists have argued that because Ulster's size has changed much over the centuries, Ulster can be applied to Northern Ireland alone. The Government of Northern Ireland once considered a proposal to change the official name to Ulster. Some also reject the claim of the Republic of Ireland to have inherited the tradition of the Irish Republic of the Irish War of Independence, because it excludes the north east, and refer to the Republic variously as the Free State or The Twenty-Six Counties.

The Province is also sometimes used, referring directly to the status of Northern Ireland as a "province" of the United Kingdom. This also, however, could be obliquely used to refer to the province of Ulster; and since no other constituent part of the United Kingdom is known as a province, a less controversial usage is "the region".

In 1949, members of the United Kingdom parliament debated how best it was to respond to Ireland's decision to terminate its last connection with the British King. Ireland also adopted a law saying that the state could be described as the Republic of Ireland. Some British MPs did not consider this was appropriate. Lieut-Colonel Sir Thomas Moore M.P. said that "Ulster has as much right to be called the "Kingdom of Ireland" as Southern Ireland has to be called the "Republic of Ireland." However, Northern Ireland was never renamed the Kingdom of Ireland.

Nationalist-associated names

Nationalists in the region and their supporters elsewhere commonly refer to it as The North of Ireland, The North-East or The North. This can be used to implicitly deny British sovereignty by placing it into the rest of Ireland, at least linguistically. It does, however, contain the same geographic anomaly as it does not contain Ireland's most northerly point.

The Six Counties is another popular name among republicans, as it can portray the region as a mere collection of Irish counties, rather than a legal political entity.

The Occupied Territories or The Occupied Six Counties are phrases sometimes used by some republicans, especially since the arrival of additional British Army soldiers, but originally employed simply to suggest the illegitimacy of the British presence in Northern Ireland. This is sometimes rendered as The Occupied Zone or The OZ.

Other names
In the Republic of Ireland, people typically refer to the region simply as the North. Similarly, and more commonly, in Northern Ireland, the South is sometimes used (by both unionists and nationalists) as a shorthand term for the Republic of Ireland.

Obviously, this explanation does not hold for parts of the Republic such as County Donegal giving rise to the joke that while further out in a boat on Lough Foyle, "the South is north, and the North is south".

A colloquial name for Northern Ireland which has grown in popularity in recent years is "Norn Iron", derived from an exaggerated pronunciation of 'Northern Ireland' in a broad Belfast accent. This name is often used by fans of the football team both on banners and in conversation.

Northern Ireland is literally translated to Tuaisceart Éireann in Irish (though it is sometimes known as Na Sé Chontae 'The Six Counties' as well as Tuaisceart na hÉireann '[the] North of Ireland' by republicans) and Norlin Airlann or Northern Ireland in Ulster Scots.

Government proposals to rename Northern Ireland as Ulster
Ulster unionists often use the name Ulster as a synonym for Northern Ireland. Sometimes there are calls to formally change the name of Northern Ireland to Ulster.

1937 Ulster proposal
In 1937. a plebscite was held in the Irish Free State which approved a new Constitution. Among its provisions, the name of the Irish state was changed to "Ireland"; this led to discussions, both at a governmental level and in the House of Commons of Northern Ireland, about Northern Ireland being renamed as Ulster.

UK and NI Government discussions about name change
Ahead of the renaming of the Irish Free State to simply Ireland in 1937, the British Prime Minister and the Home Secretary discussed the matter with the Prime Minister of Northern Ireland, Lord Craigavon when he was in London in July 1937. It was reported to the Cabinet that:

Later, the British Home Secretary discussed the new name for the Irish state (and other matters) with the Acting Prime Minister of Northern Ireland, J. M. Andrews on 10 December 1937 just under three weeks before the new Constitution came into effect. Since the earlier discussions with Lord Craigavon, the Law Officers have given their opinion that local
legislation changing the name of Northern Ireland to Ulster would be ultra vires, and that legislation by Westminster would be necessary if the change of name were to be made. It was this which the Home Secretary wished to discuss with Mr. Andrews. The Home Secretary reported on the discussions to his Cabinet colleagues noting the following:

Parliamentary discussions about name change
The parliamentary reports of the Parliament of Northern Ireland record an instance in 1937 where the proposal to rename Northern Ireland as Ulster was given formal consideration. On 1 December 1937, Thomas Joseph Campbell, MP (Nationalist) asked the Prime Minister of Northern Ireland whether the Government was considering changing the name of Northern Ireland, and, if so what name was being considered. Responding, the Minister of Finance J. M. Andrews MP said "the matter has been under discussion amongst Members of the Government, but no Cabinet decision has been taken".

This exchange followed speeches in parliament the previous month by two Independent Unionist MPs, Tommy Henderson and John William Nixon, raising the possible name change. Both regretted the name change was not mentioned in the King's Speech. Mr. Henderson criticised the Attorney-General for Northern Ireland's handling of the matter. He said that "the Attorney-General suggested recently that the name of Northern Ireland should be changed to Ulster". However, according to Mr Henderson, it was "absolutely impossible to change the name of this area from Northern Ireland to Ulster without amending the 1920 Act" (the Government of Ireland Act 1920). That Act could only be amended by the Parliament of the United Kingdom and not the Parliament or government of Northern Ireland. He concluded that in making the suggestion, the Attorney-General had tried to "throw dust in the eyes of the Ulster people".

This exchange had followed a statement made by the Attorney General, Sir Anthony Babbington KC on 15 November 1937 in Belfast in which he criticised the new Constitution proposed for Ireland. In particular, he was critical of its claim to jurisdiction over Northern Ireland. He said:

The Attorney General continued by saying that it was of "great importance" that the "cumbersome name" of Northern Ireland that came into the Act of 1920 alongside Southern Ireland should be changed. He continued further remarking that "The name of Southern Ireland has been changed and it was time that the name of Northern Ireland should be changed to Ulster".

1949 Ulster proposal
At a British Cabinet meeting on 22 November 1948 it was decided that a Working Party be established to "[consider] what consequential action may have to be taken by the United Kingdom Government as a result of Eire's ceasing to be a member of the Commonwealth". At the time the Irish parliament was soon expected to pass the Republic of Ireland Act, by which Ireland (formally referred to as "Eire" by the British authorities) would shortly become a republic, and thereby leave the Commonwealth.

The Working Party was chaired by the Cabinet Secretary, Norman Brook. Its report dated 1 January 1949 was presented by Prime Minister Clement Attlee to the Cabinet on 7 January 1949. Among its recommendations was that the name of Northern Ireland should be changed to Ulster. In this regard, the Working Party's report noted:

The Working Party's report appended draft legislation (a draft of the Ireland Act) including provision for the "Ulster" name change. With respect to the arguments against the name change, the report noted in particular that the UK's "Representative" (effectively Ambassador) in Dublin believed taking the name "Ulster" would "give fresh opportunities for anti-British propaganda by Eire". The report also noted that the Commonwealth Relations Office also held that view and its representative on the working party had asked that before a final decision be taken:

A Downing Street Conference between the UK and Northern Ireland governments was held on 6 January 1949. The Conference was held on the initiative of the Northern Ireland Government. Its purpose was to consider possible legislation to give statutory effect to Prime Minister Clement Attlee's assurance that Northern Ireland's constitutional position would not be prejudiced by the Republic of Ireland Act by which Ireland had decided to leave the British Commonwealth and any other possible consequences for Northern Ireland arising from the Irish decision. The UK government was represented at the Conference by the Prime Minister, the Lord Chancellor, the Home Secretary, and the Secretary of State for Commonwealth Relations while Northern Ireland premier Sir Basil Brooke led the Northern Ireland delegation. Brooke said to Attlee:

Prime Minister Attlee reported to his Cabinet colleagues the following day that he had discussed relevant Working Party proposals with the Northern Ireland delegation. "As a result of that discussion", Attlee reported that he would "recommend that the title of Northern Ireland should not be changed to Ulster".

On 10 January 1949, Prime Minister Attlee presented a memorandum of his own to his Cabinet. With respect to his recommendation that the name for Northern Ireland should not be changed, he said:

The proposed name change was the subject of some reportage in the media with The Times reporting shortly before the conference:

The fresh proposal to change the name to Ulster drew protest from the Nationalist Party MP for Fermanagh and Tyrone, Anthony Mulvey. He sent a telegram to Attlee to strongly "protest against any proposal to change the title Northern Ireland to Ulster". Mulvey argued that "[a]ny assent to the suggestion proposed can only be regarded as a calculated affront to the Irish nation and still further embitter relations between the peoples of Great Britain and Ireland...". Mulvey sent a telegram in similar terms to the Irish Minister for External Affairs, Seán MacBride who responded as follows:.

The UK government cabinet minutes of 12 January 1949 noted that "N.I. [Northern Ireland] Ministers accepted the name “N.I.” eventually" A few days after the Conference The Times also reported that "[i]t is not thought that the suggestion to rename Northern Ireland "Ulster" has found much support." In a somewhat colourful but not too accurate explanation of events, in the run up to the General Election in Northern Ireland in 1949, Thomas Loftus Cole declared that the British Government had refused to allow the name change "because the area did not comprise the nine counties of the province. We should demand our three counties [Donegal, Monaghan and Cavan] so that we could call our country Ulster, a name of which we are all proud".

See also
 Derry/Londonderry name dispute
 Geographical renaming
 Names of the Irish state
 Southern Ireland
 Terminology of the British Isles

References

External links

Ulster
Politics of Northern Ireland
History of Northern Ireland
Northern Ireland
Northern Ireland, Alternative names